A finnstick is the name given by birdwatchers to a stick used to support a binoculars. The one end of the stick is steadily attached to the binocular while the other end rests against the belly.

Finnsticks help to keep the binoculars steady especially when they are used for a prolonged time. In addition to keeping the image steady which allows for finer details of the object to be discerned, the use of the stick reduces muscle strain thus enabling longer viewing with less sore muscles afterwards. Some birdwatchers feel that the use of a finnstick does not markedly improve the viewer's ability to resolve detail, but rather improves viewing comfort and prevents premature fatigue.

The finnstick is especially useful when watching migration (e.g. seabirds, raptors) when the horizon may be scanned literally for hours to find migrant birds.

As the name implies the stick was invented by the Finns but is now also used in other countries, mainly in Europe. Alternative strategies for steadying the binoculars include supporting the arms against the body.

Some birdwatchers have extended the idea by using a telescoping stick either as a finnstick or a monopod, depending on the situation.

Manufacture 

A simple finnstick can be made from a piece of wood such as an old hockey stick, or from the leg of an old tripod. The upper end of the stick needs to be adjusted to each binocular model. In the cold Finnish climate it is common to cover finnsticks made of metal with an insulator to keep the hands warmer.

Finnsticks are also commercially available and some binocular manufacturers provide an attachment for a finnstick (or a monopod) as an accessory.

References 
Collins, Walter S., 1993: "The Finnstick". Birding 25:264
Mikkola, Karno, 1996: Seipiö. Alula 2: 36 (in Finnish)

Ornithological equipment and methods